Euconnus is a large genus of beetles belonging to the family Staphylinidae, subfamily Scydmaeninae, with over 200 species worldwide. There are 37 subgenera within this genus.

References

Staphylinidae
Staphylinidae genera